Path to War is a 2002 American biographical television film, produced by HBO and directed by John Frankenheimer. It was the final film directed by Frankenheimer, who died seven weeks after the film debuted on HBO. It was also the last film produced by Edgar J. Scherick during his lifetime—he died seven months after its initial airing on HBO.

Plot
The film deals directly with the Vietnam War as seen through the eyes of United States President Lyndon B. Johnson and his cabinet members. The starting events portrayed begin in January 1965 with LBJ at the Inaugural Ball and ends on March 31, 1968, when he announces to the nation that he will not run for re-election.

At the start of the movie, President Johnson (Michael Gambon) is focusing on his "Great Society" which is a series of new laws and programs addressing social issues in the United States. These include civil rights, poverty, and education. In a cabinet meeting, he is pressured by General Earle Wheeler (Frederic Forrest) into sending combat troops into South Vietnam as attacks against the American advisors there has been increasing. There is general consensus in the room except for George Ball (Bruce McGill) who argues that the North Vietnamese will only continue to escalate the attacks. Johnson, believing that the addition of combat troops will make South Vietnam more secure, approves the request.

Johnson is still trying to focus on his "Great Society" including meeting with George Wallace (Gary Sinise) on the problems with African American voter registration, and with Martin Luther King Jr. (Curtis McClarin). He asks King to ease up on his civil rights protests until after they deal with the situation in Vietnam. King does not grant Johnson's request to pause his work in the civil-rights movement, saying civil rights shouldn't have to wait for any change in Vietnam.

General Wheeler continues to argue for additional troops and further escalation of the war. Johnson asks Clark Clifford (Donald Sutherland) to attend a meeting as he had been an advisor to President Kennedy. In the meeting Clifford supports Ball and points out that if the North Vietnamese send in just 100,000 men, the USA will need to send in 1,000,000 to achieve the 10 to 1 ratio needed in a guerilla war. Secretary of Defense Robert McNamara (Alec Baldwin) is extremely confident that the additional pressure will force the North Vietnamese to negotiate a peace.

After each escalation, General Wheeler and General William Westmoreland (Tom Skerritt) state that victory is close and with additional troops it can be achieved. Westmoreland submits a plan which calls for big increase in troops and the start of bombing of North Vietnam. Johnson has a meeting where Clifford argues against escalation stating that Johnson has been elected by a huge majority and withdrawing now cannot hurt him. McNamara argues that if the USA pulls out now, the country's prestige with our Allies will suffer. He is still confident that the increase of troops and the start of bombing will lead to a negotiated peace. Johnson is convinced and approves the escalation and the start of bombing.

McNamara has his confidence shaken when he watches a man, Norman Morrison, pour gasoline on himself and set himself on fire. Previously he thought the North Vietnamese would act in a logical way and realize that peace is the better alternative, now he understands some people won't consider logic. With the bombing campaign underway, McNamara tells Johnson that he can no longer hide the cost of the war in the budget. Johnson eventually gives his approval but insists that as much as possible should still be hidden. Johnson and his advisors get a CIA briefing on the impact of the bombing has had on North Vietnam. The CIA briefer (J.K. Simmons) reports that the bombing has had little impact. If a bridge is bombed they can have it rebuilt in less than a day. He explains the North Vietnamese teenagers have grown up with war. He tells that teenagers on a first date might fill in a bomb crater. General Weaver insists that the problem has been the bombing needs to be expanded to include Hanoi and Haiphong. This would mean a higher chance of civilian casualties. Johnson is surprised when McNamara isn't sure the expansion is a good idea but that Clifford states the President made the decision to have a policy of expansion six months ago. Johnson orders the expansion.

The opposition to the war grows in the US. Johnson gets upset when he hears any criticism of the war by Robert F. Kennedy, who he thinks will run against him for president in 1968. He thinks that the war will overshadow all the work he accomplished with the Great Society. The number of Americans killed continue to grow, and Johnson hand signs every consolation letter for each death. It's reported that the expanded bombing has had little impact as the North Vietnamese had distributed their resources rather than leave them concentrated. General Wheeler asks for a continued expansion stating they are still being restricted from bombing targets in population centers. Johnson again approves.

With the bombing causing casualties but having little impact on the war, McNamara is increasingly despondent. In January 1968 the North Vietnamese start the Tet Offensive which includes attacks on the American Embassy and most of the main South Vietnamese cities. The Americans defeat all the attacks, so that the Generals consider it a victory. However the fact that there was such a big offensive means the war isn't close to being over as the Army had predicted. McNamara testifies before Congress that the bombing expansion will include targets smaller than his corner gas station and implies he is against it. When Johnson hears this, he works out a plan to have McNamara move from Secretary of Defense to head the World Bank. McNamara learns about this from the newspapers.  Johnson presents McNamara with the Presidential Medal of Freedom. While receiving it, McNamara can only think of the casualties. Clark Clifford is made the new Secretary of Defense. Clifford tells Johnson that unless he stops the war he won't be reelected in 1968. Johnson begins ranting about how all the holdovers from the Kennedy era betrayed him. Clifford replies that those people were advisors and Johnson himself made the decisions.

The film ends with Johnson giving a televised speech stating that he will restrict the bombing and ask for negotiations. He says that he will concentrate on that and will not accept the nomination for President in 1968. A scrawl states that the war continues under Nixon and 58,000 Americans and 2,000,000 Vietnamese were killed by the time it ends.

Cast
The film stars Michael Gambon as President Johnson, Alec Baldwin as Secretary of Defense Robert McNamara and Donald Sutherland as presidential advisor Clark M. Clifford, who succeeds McNamara as Secretary of Defense. Gary Sinise reprised his role as George Wallace from Frankenheimer's 1997 biopic of Wallace.

In addition, future Academy Award winner J.K. Simmons portrays a briefer from the CIA.

Reception

Critical response
Television critic Matt Zoller Seitz in his 2016 book co-written with Alan Sepinwall titled TV (The Book) named Path to War as the 6th greatest American TV-movie of all time, writing: "This nearly three-hour epic plays like the greatest political drama that Oliver Stone never made.... This is easily the greatest of Frankenheimer's late-period TV work, which equals his finest work from the 1960s".

According to The Washington Post: "Gambon is entirely up to the task of making a larger-than-life icon seem painfully -- and in the end, helplessly -- human. It is a performance of fire and brimstone".

Awards
Sutherland won a 2002 Golden Globe Award for Best Supporting Actor – Series, Miniseries or Television Film for his performance as Clifford.

See also
2002 in television
Presidency of Lyndon B. Johnson

References

External links
Official site
 Path to War in HBO

Reviews
TELEVISION/RADIO; A Vietnam War Film Takes On a Sudden Resonance by Bernard Weinraub, 9 December 2001, The New York Times. 
LBJ's tortured 'Path to War' / HBO movie shows two sides of Johnson in Vietnam era, by Jonathan Curiel, San Francisco Chronicle, Saturday, 18 May 2002.
Path to War, by Lesley Smith, PopMatters, 10 June 2002.

2002 television films
2002 films
2002 biographical drama films
American biographical drama films
Films about Lyndon B. Johnson
Films directed by John Frankenheimer
Films scored by Gary Chang
Films set in 1965
Films set in 1968
Films set in the White House
HBO Films films
Vietnam War films
Films about Martin Luther King Jr.
American drama television films
2000s American films